Nadiya Bodrova (born 13 July 1961) is a Ukrainian hurdler. She competed in the 100 metres hurdles at the 1996 Summer Olympics and the 2000 Summer Olympics.

References

1961 births
Living people
Athletes (track and field) at the 1996 Summer Olympics
Athletes (track and field) at the 2000 Summer Olympics
Ukrainian female hurdlers
Olympic athletes of Ukraine
Place of birth missing (living people)
Universiade medalists in athletics (track and field)
Soviet female hurdlers
Universiade silver medalists for the Soviet Union
Medalists at the 1985 Summer Universiade